Jürgen Zopp (born 29 March 1988) is a retired professional Estonian tennis player. He is Estonia's all-time highest ranked male tennis player with a career-high singles ranking of World No. 71 in 2012.

Career
Zopp started playing tennis at the age of 6 and grew up idolizing Pete Sampras, Marat Safin, and Roger Federer. Zopp had a somewhat successful junior career, reaching the second round of the Australian and US Open Boys' tournaments in 2006. In 2008, he would officially turn pro.

Zopp made a breakthrough on the ATP tour in 2012, qualifying for the main draws of the Australian Open, Roland-Garros and Wimbledon boosting his ranking to the point where he didn’t have to go through qualifying by the time the US Open came around. and achieving his first main draw ATP tournament win at the 2012 Bucharest Open establishing himself as a top-100 player in the ATP rankings at world No. 71.

2013-2014 would see a huge dip in form and rankings as his ranking plummeted all the way down to the 300s in 2014. Early 2017 would be the lowest of his career as his ranking dropped to 500 on June 12, 2017. Late 2017 would see a steady increase of form and rankings grabbing a handful of challenger and ITF finals. However still struggling to even qualify for an ATP event.

In qualifying for the 2018 French Open he defeated Thanasi Kokkinakis. Although he lost in the final round of qualifying to Denis Kudla it was enough for him to make the main draw as a lucky loser. In the first round he defeated American seed Jack Sock for his sixth tour level win on clay. He then defeated fellow lucky loser Ruben Bemelmans despite losing the first two sets, therefore reaching a career-best third round at Grand Slam events. He was the first Estonian player to reach the third round of a Grand Slam. His run ended in the third round following a defeat to Maximilian Marterer. 

At the 2018 Swiss Open Gstaad, he defeated the 1st seed Fabio Fognini and made it all the way to the semifinals before losing to Matteo Berrettini. 2018 is considered by some to be the best year of his career as he returned to the top 100 for the first time since 2012 and started consistently qualifying for ATP events again.

2019 would see a dip in form and rankings again. He failed to make an ATP event or a challenger final the entire year and his ranking dropped back down to the 400s again by the end of the year.

On December 18, 2020, Zopp announced his retirement from professional tennis.

Between 2022–23 Zopp appeared in 3 Davis Cup matches (1 singles and 2 doubles), winning them all.

Grand Slam performance timeline

ATP Challenger and ITF Futures finals

Singles: 24 (18–6)

Doubles: 13 (4–9)

References

External links 

 
 
 

1988 births
Living people
Sportspeople from Tallinn
Estonian male tennis players